Line 27 of the Shenzhen Metro is a line under planning, which will connect the districts of Nanshan, Longhua and Longgang. Construction is planned to begin in 2023. The first phase of Line 27 has entered Phase V planning, and will run from Songpingcun in Nanshan District near Xili High Speed Railway Station to Gangtou West in Longhua District, with 19 stations and 23.2 kilometers of track. The line is proposed to use 6 car type B trains.

Stations (Phase 1)

References

Shenzhen Metro lines
Transport infrastructure under construction in China